Vernonica "Noni" Elsa Franklin-Tong  is an English plant cell biologist who is Emeritus Professor at the University of Birmingham. She is known for her studies on self-incompatibility in Papaver rhoeas. In 2021 she was elected a Fellow of the Royal Society.

Early life and education 
Franklin-Tong was born in London. She was an undergraduate student at the University of Birmingham, where she majored in biological sciences. She remained at Birmingham for her graduate studies, where she completed a PhD on the genetics of self-incompatibility in Papaver rhoeas in 1986.

Research and career 
Franklin-Tong was awarded a Biotechnology and Biological Sciences Research Council (BBSRC) advanced fellowship. In 1997, she was appointed a lecturer at the University of Birmingham, and promoted to chair in 2004. Her research investigates the cellular mechanisms involved in the regulation of the cell-cell recognition system of self-incompatibility in Papaver rhoeas. Self-incompatibility prevents inbreeding through the recognition and inhibition of a flower's own pollen, ultimately determining the reproductive success of flowering plants.

Franklin-Tong developed an in vitro bioassay that allowed for the first investigations into the cell biology of self-incompatibility, unravelling the mechanisms that underpin the rejection of pollen that is not compatible. She identified an intricate intracellular signalling network that regulates this self-incompatibility and culminates in cell death.

She showed that the pollen S-determinant (PrpS) can be expressed in Arabidopsis thaliana, a model plant that is self-compatibile. When transgenic Arabidopsis thaliana pollen is exposed to recombinant Papaver rhoeas a similar response occurs to those detected in incompatible Papaver rhoeas pollen. This indicates that PrpS is a species with no self-incompatibility that diverged over one hundred million years ago.

Selected publications

Personal life 
Franklin-Tong was diagnosed with breast cancer in 2014.

References 

Living people
Year of birth missing (living people)
People from London
English biologists
Fellows of the Royal Society
Alumni of the University of Birmingham
Academic staff of Umeå University